A Menina da Rádio  is a 1944 Portuguese musical film comedy directed by Arthur Duarte.

Cast
 Maria Matos	... 	D. Rosa Gonçalves
 António Silva	... 	Cipriano Lopes
 Maria Eugénia	... 	Geninha, a Menina da Rádio
 Francisco Ribeiro	... 	Fortunato
 Óscar de Lemos	... 	Óscar
 Teresa Casal	... 	Teresa Waldemar
 Aida Ultz	... 	Aidinha Seabra
 Maria Olguim	... 	Maria do Ó
 Manuel Santos Carvalho	... 	Leitão
 Silvestre Alegrim	... 	Night-watchman
 Vital dos Santos
 Sales Ribeiro
 Emilia D'Oliveira
 Leticia Brazao
 Mendonça de Carvalho

External links
 

1940s Portuguese-language films
1944 films
1944 musical comedy films
Portuguese musical comedy films
Portuguese black-and-white films